Wolves in the British Isles may refer to:

Wolves in Great Britain
Wolves in Ireland